Texas State Highway Spur 529 is a spur route in the U.S. state of Texas that remains within Fort Bend County. The highway begins at Interstate 69 (I-69)/U.S. Route 59 (US 59) southwest of Rosenberg, continues  to the northeast and ends at an intersection with U.S. Route 90 Alternate (US 90A) and Texas State Highway 36 (SH 36) inside the western part of Rosenberg.

History
On August 23, 1976, Spur 529 was designated to run from US 90A in Rosenberg southwest to US 59. The 1955 United States Geological Survey (USGS) map of Richmond showed that US 59 and US 90A shared the same right-of-way as far as the western edge of Rosenberg. At that point, US 59 forked to the southwest toward Beasley, alongside the Texas and New Orleans Railroad. The 1971 USGS map showed the new US 59 (now dual signed as I-69/US 59) freeway passing to the south of Rosenberg. Spur 529 was labeled in purple which meant that the change occurred between 1971 and the 1980 map revision.

Route description
Spur 529 begins at a stop sign on I-69/US 59 southwest of Rosenberg. At that point I-69/US 59 is a four lane divided highway called the Southwest Freeway. The two-lane Spur 529 then turns to the northeast next to the Union Pacific Railroad tracks, and continues in a straight line until near its northern terminus. Spur 529 passes a few large manufacturing establishments before the Seabourne Meadows subdivision appears on the right. After about  the highway intersects FM 1640, also called Avenue I. In the last , Spur 529 curves to the east into Avenue H and ends at a stop sign at US 90A and SH 36.

Major intersections

References

529
Transportation in Fort Bend County, Texas